Idia parvulalis is a species of litter moth of the family Erebidae first described by William Barnes and James Halliday McDunnough in 1911. It is found in North America, including its type location, the Santa Catalina Mountains in south-eastern Arizona.

References

External links
Moths of Southeastern Arizona 

Herminiinae
Santa Catalina Mountains
Taxa named by William Barnes (entomologist)
Taxa named by James Halliday McDunnough
Moths described in 1911